Cassa di Risparmio di Trieste was an Italian savings bank headquartered in Trieste that operated between 1842 and 2002.  

Cassa di Risparmio di Trieste - Banca S.p.A. joined newly formed banking group UniCredit in 1999. The bank, as a brand and subsidiary, survived within UniCredit until 2002 when it was merged with 6 other sub-brands to form UniCredit Banca and other divisions of UniCredit.

History
Founded in 1842 in the Imperial Free City of Trieste, in the Austrian Empire. The city later became the capital of the Austrian Littoral of the empire and belongs to the Kingdom of Italy since 1921. Since joined Italy, the bank merged with other savings bank such as bank from Postumia due to a decree-law enacted in 1927. (Postumia belongs to Italy between the two world war, but now located in Slovenia.)

A report by Mediobanca, shown the bank was ranked 75th by total assets in 1988, among all type of commercial banks of Italy.

At first the S.p.A. had a share capital of 220 billion lire.

In 1998, The Economist credited the bank as "Italy's most successful international bank" for its cross-border banking subsidiary Trscanska Stedionica – Banka. In the same year, a subsidiary, Cassa di Risparmio di Trieste Specialcredito, which specialize in  such as public works and medium-long term loan, was sold to Assicurazioni Generali, which became Banca Generali. Before the handover of the company, the medium-long term loan business was sold back to Cassa di Risparmio di Trieste.

In 1999, the banking foundation sold the controlling interests of the bank (s.p.a.) to UniCredit. , the foundation retained 20% shares of the S.p.A., as well as owned 0.79% shares of UniCredit. The foundation also owned a private equity fund "Fondo Gestiveneto 6", which was managed by Pioneer Investments of UniCredit group.

In 2002 the S.p.A. was absorbed by Credito Italiano; the legal person of Credito Italiano then renamed into UniCredit Banca, as the new retail arm of the banking group. Several subsidiaries were also spin off from UniCredit Banca in 2003 as separate entities of the group.

The Croatian subsidiary of C.R. Trieste was merged into Zagrebačka banka, while C.R. Trieste Ireland was liquidated, as it was overlapped with UniCredit Bank Ireland (UniCredito Italiano Bank (Ireland) plc).

Subsidiaries

 C.R. Trieste Ireland Ltd. (99.99%)
 Cassa di Risparmio di Trieste – Banca d.d. Zagreb (83.95%)
 Cassa di Risparmio di Trieste – Specialcredito S.p.A. (former)

Equity investments

 The Bank of Italy (0.44%)
 Friulia (1.27%)
 Friulia-Lis (2.25%))
 Liseuro (35.11%)

Banking foundation
After the bank became defunct, the charity function, as well as the bank's arts collection were survived as an organization Fondazione Cassa di Risparmio di Trieste or Fondazione CRTrieste. , the foundation had an equity of €204 million. The foundation write-down the value of the shares of UniCredit its owned (17,444,018 number of shares before 2017 reverse stock split; 0.282%), as well as the shares of Banca Mediocredito del Friuli Venezia Giulia (34,440,610 number of shares; 30.502%). In addition, the foundation owned 875,977 number of shares (0.256%) of Cassa Depositi e Prestiti as well as other investment, such as FriulAdria, Fincantieri (0.071%) and GEDI Gruppo Editoriale.

See also

 Cassa di Risparmio del Friuli Venezia Giulia, a subsidiary of Intesa Sanpaolo
 Banca Popolare di Trieste, a co-operative bank that was acquired by Banca Popolare di Vicenza

References

External links
  (currently redirect to UniCredit)
 
 Official website of Fondazione CRTrieste

Defunct banks of Italy
Defunct banks of Croatia
Multinational companies headquartered in Italy
Companies based in Trieste
Companies based in Zagreb
Former UniCredit subsidiaries
Banks established in 1842
Italian companies established in 1842
1842 establishments in the Austrian Empire
Banks established in 1996
1996 establishments in Croatia
Banks disestablished in 2002
Italian companies disestablished in 2002